Bentley Rhythm Ace is the debut studio album by Bentley Rhythm Ace, released in 1997. It peaked at number 13 on the UK Albums Chart. NME named it the 9th best album of 1997.

In August 2016 Richard March provided a track-by-track insight into some of the samples, sounds, instruments and musicians used on the album.

Track listing

Charts

Release history

References

External links
 

1997 debut albums
Bentley Rhythm Ace albums
Parlophone albums
Astralwerks albums
Skint Records albums